Štěpánov nad Svratkou (until 1951 Štěpánov) is a market town in Žďár nad Sázavou District in the Vysočina Region of the Czech Republic. It has about 700 inhabitants.

Administrative parts
The village of Vrtěžíř is an administrative part of Štěpánov nad Svratkou.

References

Populated places in Žďár nad Sázavou District
Market towns in the Czech Republic